Neoharmsia baronii is a species of legume in the family Fabaceae. It is found only in Madagascar.

References

Sophoreae
Endemic flora of Madagascar
Taxonomy articles created by Polbot

Endangered flora of Africa